The UNCAF Club Tournament was an annual international football competition held in the UNCAF region (Central America). The competition was open to the leading domestic club teams in the region. The winners of each national league qualified automatically. It also provided qualification places for the CONCACAF Champions' Cup, to which the top three teams advanced. Starting in 2008, all of the Central American nations have one or two teams qualifying directly to the expanded CONCACAF Champions League, thus this tournament ceased to be played.

The tournament had been known as the Copa Fraternidad Centroamericana from 1971 to 1983. It was discontinued between 1983 and 1996, when it was revived as the Torneo Grandes de Centroamerica. In 1998, the tournament was renamed Copa Interclubes UNCAF. It was held on an annual basis between 1998 and the last edition played in 2007.

In 2016, a new women's tournament was introduced.

All-time table
 From 1999 to 2007, only top 10 showing.

Results

By club

By country

Women's tournament

In 2016, the Central American Football Union revived the competition by inaugurating a tournament open to women's clubs.  Costa Rican side Moravia obtained the first tournament contested in Costa Rica.  As opposed to the men's cup, this tournament is played in a fixed host.

See also
 CONCACAF League
 CONCACAF Central American Cup

References

External links 
RSSSF archive

 
Central American Football Union competitions
Defunct CONCACAF club competitions
Recurring sporting events established in 1971
Recurring events disestablished in 2007
1971 establishments in North America
2007 disestablishments in North America